Axel Olai Heikel (April 28, 1851 – September 6, 1924) was a Finnish ethnographer and archaeologist, and cousin of Viktor, Felix, Anna, and Ivar Heikel. He is one of the founders of ethnology in Finland.

Biography
Heikel was born on April 28, 1851, in Brändö, Åland, Finland, to vicar Carl Henrik and Emma Fredrika Heikel née Wallin.

He received his master's degree in 1880 from the Imperial Alexander University (today the University of Helsinki). From 1889 to 1892, Heikel was an associate professor of Finnish ethnography in Helsinki; in 1893 he became curator of the Archaeological Commission and in 1917 of the Ethnographic Museum of Seurasaari, which was his creation. He was awarded the honorary title of professor in 1920.

Heikel studied Estonian, Volga Finn, and Finnish architecture. Between 1883 and 1886 and 1889 and 1893 he undertook extensive ethnographic and archaeological research trips to Finno-Ugric tribes, including the Mari, Mordvin and Udmurt people, in Russia. He also made trips to Mongolia, Siberia, and Karelia. In 1893, Heikel became the first to discover traces of the Andronovo culture near Yalutorovsk. His doctoral thesis from these trips received a mixed reaction in Finland but was widely read in Germany and Russia. Heikel was inspired by Finnish archaeologist J. R. Aspelin.

He founded the Seurasaari Open-Air Museum in Helsinki, Finland, which he "considered his second home", after being inspired by Swedish folklorist Arthur Hazelius' open-air museum Skansen in Stockholm. His goal was to create a "miniature Finland" featuring buildings moved there representing different parts of the country. He became the museum's curator in 1917.

Heikel died on September 6, 1924, in Helsinki, Finland, after a long illness.

Heikel was one of the University of Helsinki Faculty of Arts' 375 Humanists on March 14, 2015.

Family
Heikel married Maria Castrén in 1890. They had five children: Aili Martta Oilokai Heikel, Elsa Arna Jyrhämä, Maija Kaarina Bärlund-Karma, Kerttu Annikki Heikel, and Siiri Kyllikki Nordlund.

Works
 (1878) 
 (1885) 
 (thesis, 1887) 
 (1888) 
 (1888) 
 (1892) 
 (1894) 
/ (1896) 
 (1898) 
 (presentation, 1899) 
 (1906) 
 (1909) 
The Fölisö Open-air Museum (1912) 
 (1912) 
 (1912) 
 (1913) 
 (1913) 
 (1914) 
 (1915) 
 (1919) 
 (1919) 
 (1922)

See also
Ingala Valley
Finno-Ugrian Society

References

Notes

Sources

External links 

Axel Heikel on geni.com
Axel Olai Heikel on worldcat.org
Axel Olai Heikel. University of Helsinki

1851 births
1924 deaths
Finnish archaeologists
Finnish ethnographers
Academic staff of the University of Helsinki
People from the Grand Duchy of Finland